WQLJ (105.5 FM, "Q105") is a radio station in Water Valley, Mississippi and is owned by Telesouth Communications Inc and airs a hot adult contemporary format.

History
On May 28, 2015 the then-WTNM changed its format from talk (branded as "Super Talk Mississippi") to hot adult contemporary, branded as "Q105". On June 4, 2015, WTNM changed its call letters to WQLJ.

References

External links

Hot adult contemporary radio stations in the United States
QLJ
Radio stations established in 1996